Peter Randall-Page RA (born 1954) is a British artist and sculptor, known for his stone sculpture work, inspired by geometric patterns from nature. In his words "geometry is the theme on which nature plays her infinite variations, fundamental mathematical principle become a kind of pattern book from which nature constructs the most complex and sophisticated structures".

Biography 
Randall-Page was born in Essex and spent his childhood in Sussex both studying at the Bath Academy of Art from 1973 to 1977 after which he worked with the sculptor Barry Flanagan. After working on a conservation project at Wells Cathedral, Randall-Page went to Italy to study stone carving at the Carrara quarries. Returning to Britain, he was a visiting lecturer at Brighton Polytechnic throughout the 1980s and established a studio at Drewsteignton in Devon. From there he undertook a number of significant public sculpture commissions, often featuring fruit and organic forms. These included works for the regeneration of Castle Park in Bristol and for the Eden Project in Cornwall. For the Eden Project he was a member of the design team for the Education Resource Centre (The Core), influencing the overall design of the building and incorporating an enormous granite sculpture, Seed, at its heart. A major retrospective of his work was held in 1992 at the Leeds City Art Gallery and the Yorkshire Sculpture Park. During 1994 Randall-Page held an artist-in-residence post at the Tasmanian School of Art and undertook a lecture tour of Australia, supported by the Arts Council England.

In 1980 he was taken on by the Anne Berthoud Gallery in London's Covent Garden. Randall-Page's work is held in numerous public and private collections throughout the world including Japan, South Korea, Australia, United States, Ireland, Germany and the Netherlands. His public sculptures can be found in London, Edinburgh, Manchester, Bristol and Newbury. His work is represented in the permanent collections of the Tate Gallery and the British Museum.

Randall-Page was elected to the Royal Academy in 2015. In 1999, he was awarded an Honorary Doctorate of Arts from the University of Plymouth and from 2002 to 2005 was an Associate Research Fellow at Dartington College of Arts. The National Portrait Gallery collection has a 2003 bromide print of Randall-Page.

Public collections
 Arnolfini Collection Trust, Bristol
 The British Council.
 The British Embassy, Dublin
 The British Museum
 Bughley Sculpture Garden
 Castle Museum and Art Gallery, Nottingham
 The Contemporary Art Society, London
 The Creasy Collection of Contemporary Art, Salisbury
 Derby Arboretum
 University of Exeter
 Leeds City Art Galleries
 Lincoln City Council
 Milton Keynes Community NHS Trust
 The National Trust Foundation for Art
 Nottinghamshire City Council
 University of Nottingham
 Prior's Court School for Autistic Children, Thatcham
 University of Tasmania
 Tate Collection; 'Where the Bee Sucks'(1991)
 Ulster Museum, Belfast
 Usher Gallery, Lincolnshire County Council
 University of Warwick, Coventry
 West Kent College, Tonbridge
 The Dartington Hall Trust estate, Devon
 The Eden Centre, Cornwall

Selected public works

Further reading
 London Art and Artists Guide 10th edition, Heather Waddell
 Sculpture in 20th-century Britain, Henry Moore Institute 2003
 Reviews Artists and Public Space, Black Dog Publishing 2005

References

External links

 Official Website
 Peter Randall-Page talks about his sculpture; Womb Tomb

1954 births
Living people
British sculptors
British male sculptors
Alumni of Bath School of Art and Design
Royal Academicians